Graziana is a genus of minute freshwater snails with an operculum, aquatic gastropod molluscs or micromolluscs in the family Hydrobiidae.

Species
Species within the genus Graziana include:

Graziana adlitzensis
Graziana alpestris
Graziana cezairensis
Graziana klagenfurtensis Haase, 1994
Graziana lacheineri Küster, 1853
Graziana provincialis
Graziana pupula (Westerlund, 1886)
Graziana quadrifoglio
Graziana trinitatis

References

 
Hydrobiidae
Taxonomy articles created by Polbot